The 1907 Philadelphia mayoral election saw the election of John Edger Reyburn as a Jeffersonian Republican over William Potter, who ran as a City-Democrat.

Results

References

1907
Philadelphia
1907 Pennsylvania elections
1900s in Philadelphia